501 is a year in the Common Era.

501 may also refer to:

501 BC, a year in the era B.C.
501 (number)

Military
Avro 501, a military seaplane 
501 Squadron (disambiguation), several units
501 Organization, a fictional unit from a Japanese anime series Ghost in the Shell: Arise

Transportation
List of highways numbered 501, one of a number of highways
Flight 501 (disambiguation), several flights
501 Queen, a streetcar route in Toronto
Allison 501, an aircraft turboprop engine
BMW 501, a BMW car model
British Rail Class 501, a U.K. train model
Fiat 501, a Fiat car model

Other uses
501, the name of a game of darts
Section 501, a provision of the Australian Migration Act 1958
The record score in first-class cricket by Brian Lara, and also Lara's brand of clothing in honour of this event
a type of Levi's jeans
an HTTP status code meaning Not implemented
SMTP Error - 501, an SMTP status code meaning Syntax error in parameters or arguments
501(c), a type of tax exemption for non-profit organizations in the United States
Area code 501, covering part of Arkansas, U.S.
Year 501: The Conquest Continues, by a book by Noam Chomsky
501 Urhixidur, an asteroid
SARS-CoV-2 Beta variant, variant of COVID-19 also known as 501.V2 or 501Y.V2

See also
 501st (disambiguation)